William Harvey (1920 – 3 February 2002) was an English footballer, more notable as a manager than as a player, who managed Luton Town and Grimsby Town.

Career
Harvey signed for his home town club Grimsby Town as a player before World War II, but never made the first team. After the end of hostilities, he decided to concentrate on coaching. His first managing appointment came in 1962, when he was made manager of Bedfordshire outfit Luton Town. In his first season Luton were relegated from Division Two, and Harvey resigned in November 1964. He returned to coaching, working at Swindon Town and Bristol City. Harvey returned to Grimsby in 1968, but with Harvey in charge the team were first relegated and then finished in the re-election spots of Division Four. Grimsby were re-elected to the Football League but Harvey resigned after a year in charge, and never managed again.

He was also a coach and caretaker manager at Peterborough United.

References

External links
. Note that Soccerbase has conflated his record with that of another Bill Harvey.

1920 births
2002 deaths
English footballers
Footballers from Grimsby
English Football League players
Grimsby Town F.C. players
English football managers
Luton Town F.C. managers
Grimsby Town F.C. managers
Association footballers not categorized by position